The  was a DC electric multiple unit (EMU) train type operated by the private railway operator Nagano Electric Railway in Japan from March 1957 until March 2012.

Formations
The sets were formed as follows.

The Mc1 and Mc2 cars were each fitted with one lozenge-type pantograph.

Exterior
The first three sets (A to C) delivered trains were finished in a deep maroon livery with a thin waistline stripe and end "whiskers". Set D was delivered in a two-tone livery of maroon and cream. All sets were subsequently repainted into the same two-tone livery, and this was replaced by a revised livery with crimson window band when the sets were modified with air-conditioning from 1989 to 1990. In 2007, set A was returned to its original deep maroon livery, and set D was repainted into its original crimson and cream "apple" livery.

Interior

The sets had pairs of seats that rotate to face the direction of travel.

History
The first two sets (A and B) were delivered in February 1957 from Nippon Sharyo's Tokyo factory, and entered service from March 1957. The 2nd-batch set (set C) was delivered in November 1959 from Nippon Sharyo's Tokyo factory, and the 3rd-batch set (set D) was delivered in August 1964 from Nippon Sharyo's Nagoya factory.

Sets B and C were withdrawn in 2005 and 2006 respectively following the introduction of 1000 series EMUs. With the introduction of new 2100 series EMUs, set A was withdrawn in March 2011, and set D was also removed from regular service, except for special services, and while final withdrawal was originally scheduled for August 2011, it was kept in occasional use up until March 2013.

References

External links

 Nagano Electric Railway site 

Rail transport in Nagano Prefecture
Electric multiple units of Japan
Train-related introductions in 1957
1957 in rail transport
1500 V DC multiple units of Japan
Nippon Sharyo multiple units